The Platzer Motte is a German amateur-built aircraft designed by Michael Platzer and made available in the form of plans for amateur construction.

Design and development
The Motte features a strut-braced parasol wing configuration, single-seat open cockpit with a small windshield, fixed conventional landing gear and a single engine in tractor configuration.

The aircraft uses the same wing design as the Platzer Kiebitz biplane. The Motte's fuselage is made from metal tubing, with its flying surfaces covered in doped aircraft fabric. Its  span wing has an area of  supported by V-struts and jury struts. Engines used include the  Nissan 12P automotive engine from a Nissan Micra, as well as the  Rotax 462 powerplant.

Pilot access can be difficult due to the proximity of the wing mounted close above the cockpit. Builders have solved this with a trailing edge wing cut-out.

Operational history
The Motte was Platzer's first design, but his later two-seat Kiebitz biplane has proven much more popular than the Motte with builders.

Specifications (Motte)

References

External links

Homebuilt aircraft
Single-engined tractor aircraft
Parasol-wing aircraft
2000s German aircraft